This is a list of Punjabi films of 2020.

Box Office

Released

Events 

 PTC Entertainment Festival 2020 including PTC Punjabi Film Awards and PTC Punjabi Music Awards in March 2020

References

External links
Pollywood news on The Tribune

2020
Films
Punjabi